The Gornje Jame massacre was the killing of fifteen Croat civilians in Gornje Jame, a village near Glina, by the Serbian paramilitary force called Šiltovi.

Events
In 1991, seventeen Croats, twenty-four Serbs and three others lived in Gornje Jame. On December 11th of that year, armed members of the Šiltovi paramilitary force entered Mate Kireta's house and assembled twelve Croat civilians there, including seven women and three children. The children were two sisters, Nikolina, age 9, and Željka Fabac, age 14, and Darko Dvorenković, age 10. Among the other victims were three women from Mala Solina, Donje Jame and Hađer, who had taken refuge at their cousins' residence.

The precise circumstances of the deaths remain unknown, as well as the fate of the women. There is speculation that they were murdered and burned in the house. Another theory is that they were taken alive to an unknown place where they were killed, their bodies buried in mud to conceal the crime.

Gojko Pavlović, a Serbian man from Donje Jame, was gunned down while trying to protect his Croatian neighbours. Three Croatian man from Gornje Jame were imprisoned on November 3, 1991, and then killed near a creek between Donje and Gornje Jame. They were exhumed and buried in 1996.

Memorial
In 2012, a monument was built in Gornje Jame to commemorate the victims of the massacre.

See also
List of massacres in Croatia

References 

A press release on the occasion of the 20th anniversary of the crime in the area of Gornje Jame and Joševica, near Glina

External links
"Glas koncila" article: Forgotten Croatian victims from Gornje Jame

Mass murder in 1991
1991 in Croatia
Massacres in 1991
December 1991 events in Europe
Serbian war crimes in the Croatian War of Independence
Massacres in Croatia
Republic of Serbian Krajina
1991 crimes in Croatia
1991 murders in Europe
1990s murders in Croatia
Massacres of Croats
Massacres in the Croatian War of Independence